Timothy E.J. Behrens  is a British neuroscientist. He is Deputy Director of the Wellcome Centre for Integrative Neuroscience and Professor of Computational Neuroscience at the University of Oxford, and Honorary Lecturer, Wellcome Centre for Imaging Neuroscience, University College London.

He earned an M.Eng. and a D.Phil. from the University of Oxford.

In 2020 he won the UK Life Sciences Blavatnik Award
for Young Scientists, having been a finalist for this award in 2018 and 2019. He was elected a Fellow of the Royal Society in the same year.

References

External links
 (Oxford)
UCL staff page

Year of birth missing (living people)
Living people
Alumni of Magdalen College, Oxford
Academics of the University of Oxford
Academics of University College London
British neuroscientists
Fellows of the Royal Society